Autrey Nell Wiley (27 May 1901 – 28 May 1990) was an American literary critic and professor. She graduated from Texas Women's University in 1922 and began teaching English the same year. She subsequently served as Dean of the School of Arts and Sciences. She retired in 1971 as chair of the English department, a role in which she'd served for more than twenty years.
Wiley earned the TWU Distinguished Alumnae Award in 1969.

Publications
Female Prologues and Epilogues in English Plays
Reiterative Devices in "Leaves of Grass" 
The English Vogue of Prologues and Epilogues
The Miller's Head Again

References

External links
Autrey Nell Wiley Papers An Inventory to the Collection

American literary critics
Women literary critics
1901 births
1990 deaths
20th-century American non-fiction writers
American women critics